Teemu Eronen (born 22 November 1990) is a Finnish professional ice hockey defenceman. He is currently a player for the Lahti Pelicans in the Finnish Liiga. He was selected by the St. Louis Blues in the 7th round (192nd overall) of the 2011 NHL Entry Draft.

Playing career
After two seasons in the Kontinental Hockey League with HC Neftekhimik Nizhnekamsk and HC Vityaz, Eronen returned to his homeland in agreeing to a two-year contract in the Liiga with HIFK on May 27, 2016.

Eronen played three seasons with HIFK before returning to the KHL with original club, Jokerit, on 24 April 2019.

Career statistics

Regular season and playoffs

International

References

External links

1990 births
Living people
Finnish ice hockey defencemen
HIFK (ice hockey) players
Jokerit players
Kiekko-Vantaa players
St. Louis Blues draft picks
HC Neftekhimik Nizhnekamsk players
HC Vityaz players
Sportspeople from Vantaa